A Choice of Magic is a 1971 anthology of 32 fairy tales from around the world that have been collected and retold by Ruth Manning-Sanders. In fact, the book is mostly a collection of tales published in previous Manning-Sanders anthologies. Stories are pulled from A Book of Princes and Princesses (1969), A Book of Giants (1962), A Book of Dwarfs (1963), A Book of Dragons (1964), A Book of Ghosts and Goblins (1968), A Book of Witches (1965), A Book of Mermaids (1967), and A Book of Wizards (1966). There are also four previously unpublished stories.

It is followed by the anthology Folk and Fairy Tales (1978), another collection of (mostly) previously published Manning-Sanders tales.

Table of contents

Foreword
1. The Wonderful Shirt (Russia)
2. The Frog (Ukraine)
3. Jack and the Beanstalk (England)
4. Knurremurre (Zeeland)
5. Bottle Hill (Ireland)
6. The Nine Doves (Greece)
7. The Goblins at the Bath House (Estonia)
8. Johnny and the Witch-Maidens (Bohemia)
9. Sven and Lilli (Denmark)
10. Aniello (Sicily)
11. Aladdin (Arabia)
12. Esben and the Witch (Denmark)
13. Sneezy Snatcher and Sammy Small (England)
14. Mons Tro (Denmark)
15. Rake Up! (Denmark)
16. King Johnny (Slavonia)
17. The Enchanted Prince (Hungary)
18. The Adventures of Billy MacDaniel (Ireland)
19. Little Hiram (India)
20. Prince Loaf (Rumania)
21. Hans and His Master (Hungary)
22. Golden Hair (Corsica)
23. Constantes and the Dragon (Greece)
24. Tatterhood (Norway)
25. The Princess's Slippers (Archangel)
26. Jack and the Wizard (Wales)
27. The Two Wizards (Africa)
28. The Three Mermaids (Italy)
29. The Girl Who Picked Strawberries (Germany)
30. The Magic Lake (Ireland)
31. Old Verlooka (Russia)
32. Stan Bolovan (Rumania)

Collections of fairy tales
Children's short story collections
E. P. Dutton books
1971 short story collections
1971 children's books
1971 anthologies